Cipriani S.A. is an Italian hotel and leisure company domiciled in Luxembourg that owns and operates luxury restaurants and clubs around the world including Harry's Bar in Venice and formerly the Rainbow Room in New York City. It specialises in simple, traditional Italian food.

Cipriani S.A. traces its history to family patriarch Giuseppe Cipriani, (1900–1980) who founded Harry's Bar in Venice in 1931.
According to the company history, Harry Pickering, a young Bostonian, had been frequenting Hotel Europa in Venice, where Giuseppe Cipriani was a bartender. When Pickering explained that he was broke because his family had found out his drinking habits and cut him off financially, Cipriani loaned Pickering 10,000 lire (about $500 US [$7,839 in 2015 dollars]). Two years later, Pickering returned to the hotel bar, ordered a drink, and gave Cipriani 50,000 lire in return. "Mr. Cipriani, thank you," he said, according to the Cipriani website. "Here's the money. And to show you my appreciation, here's 40,000 more, enough to open a bar. We will call it Harry's Bar."

Harry's Bar became a popular spot for celebrities like Ernest Hemingway and Humphrey Bogart.  Mr. Cipriani created the Bellini cocktail there, and the food dish Carpaccio is also reputed to have originated there.

Giuseppe's son Arrigo Cipriani (born 1932) is the majority owner. Arrigo is Italian for Harry. His son Giuseppe Cipriani (born 1965) is the main business manager.

History

In 1958, the elder Cipriani built the Hotel Cipriani in Venice.  In 1967, Cipriani Sr. sold rights to the Cipriani name trademark.

The family went international in 1985 under the Cipriani name when it opened Harry Cipriani in New York City in the Sherry-Netherland Hotel. Within two years the family was evicted from the hotel and opened the Cipriani Bellini bar nearby. Eventually they would return to the hotel.

In 1997 the Ciprianis bought 55 Wall Street, noted for its huge ornate former First National Bank lobby. They sold it in 1999 and bought the Bowery Savings Bank building across from Grand Central, again noted for its huge ornate lobby. 55 Wall Street Cipriani's, Grand Central Cipriani's and Cipriani Tribeca were designed by Anthony Morali of Morali Architects.

In 1998, they leased the Rainbow Room, performed minor modification / major gutting of the 87' Rockefeller Restoration and fired the members of Local 6 of the Hotel Employees and Restaurant Employees Union which picketed it. The labor dispute was settled in 1999, resulting in a recall of the displaced Local 6 employees for 10 years until 2009, when Cipriani was evicted by the owner / operator Tishman Speyer.

In 2005, the company won the rights from the Hudson River Park board to develop Pier 57 into Leonardo's, a luxury complex that included a museum, catering hall, shops, restaurants, a rooftop pool and a public park. Their principal competition was the Chelsea Piers, just north of Pier 57. After winning the bid, Michael DiLeonardo, an associate of Peter Gotti, turned state's evidence against the accused mobster. In his testimony, DiLeonardo said that the Ciprianis had paid $120,000 to the Gambino crime family to make union problems at the Rainbow Room disappear. The charges were never confirmed. However, the Ciprianis were unsuccessful in firing the union workers. The Ciprianis relinquished their rights to develop the pier after co-investors in the project withdrew.

In April 2004, Cipriani opened in London. The site on Davies Street in Mayfair was co-founded and established by Fabrizio Cerina of the Swiss banking group Credit des Alpes, who also acted as strategic advisor to Cipriani in the sale and leaseback of the Saxony Hotel, Miami in 2009, one of the biggest ever property deals in Miami.

In 2006, in partnership with attorney Steve Witkoff, Cipriani bought 55 Wall Street again.

Arrigo and Giuseppe pleaded guilty in 2007 to misdemeanor tax evasion for defrauding $3.5 million in state and city taxes for six years beginning in 1998. They were placed on probation through 2011 and an independent auditor was assigned to monitor future payments.

In 2007 and 2008, it had a bitter dispute with its landlord L&L Holdings Company headed by David W. Levinson of the International Toy Center over its ballroom in the lobby of the landmark building in the Flatiron District at 200 Fifth Avenue and 23rd. The Ciprianis ultimately agreed to pay $12 million and vacate the building by the end of January 2009.

In December 2008, the High Court of England and Wales ruled that Orient-Express Hotels (which owns the Hotel Cipriani) owns the Cipriani trademark and that the use of "Cipriani" in the name of the London restaurant infringed its trademark rights. The decision was upheld on appeal by the Court of Appeal on 24 February 2010, which ordered that the restaurant's name would have to be changed by 24 April 2010. The new name of the restaurant is "C".

In January 2009, the Ciprianis announced plans to close the Rainbow Room in a dispute with the owner of 30 Rock, Tishman Speyer Properties. Tishman in turn responded that it was evicting the Ciprianis from the Rainbow Room.

Casa Cipriani opened in the Battery Maritime Building in September 2021 and in that same month, the company announced a new restaurant within Grand Central Terminal.

Properties
Venice
Harry's Bar (Venice).
Harry's Dolci (on Giudecca).
New York City
Harry Cipriani Bar, 781 Fifth Avenue.
55 Wall Street (the family owns the building which now consists of a club, residence and restaurant,).
Cipriani 42nd Street (in the former Bowery Savings Bank at 110 East 42nd Street).
Cipriano Dolci in Grand Central Terminal.
Rainbow Grill atop 30 Rockefeller Center (closed June 2009)
Cipriani 23rd Street (in the International Toy Center) (closed January 2009)
Cipriani 25 Broadway, the former Cunard Building (New York City) grand hall, which opened in October 2014
Cipriani Downtown
Casa Cipriani, September 2021

London
C London (in Mayfair).
Los Angeles
Cipriani Beverly Hills (planned in 2010 in the former Tower Beverly Hills Hotel).
Ibiza
Cipriani's Downtown & Bellini Lounge Club
Booom! IBIZA

Porto Cervo
Cipriani Porto Cervo.
Hong Kong
Cipriani Hong Kong.
Miami Beach
Cipriani Ocean Beach and Club Residences (at the Saxony Hotel).
Istanbul
Cipriani Istanbul (at the Edition Hotel)
Mexico
Cipriani Mexico City
Monaco
Cipriani Monaco
Uruguay
Cipriani Punta del Este.

References

External links
cipriani.com

Hotel and leisure companies of Luxembourg
Privately held companies of Luxembourg
Restaurants in Manhattan
Nightclubs in Manhattan
Restaurants in London
Restaurants in Italy
Restaurants established in 1931
Italian companies established in 1931
Italian restaurants